Persatuan Sepakbola Duri is an Indonesian football club based in Duri, Mandau District, Bengkalis Regency, Riau. They currently compete in the Liga 3.

References

External links
PS Duri Instagram

Football clubs in Indonesia
Football clubs in Riau